Uxua may refer to:

 Uxua López (born 1983), Spanish telecommunications engineer, environmental activist
 UxuA RNA motif
 UXUA Casa Hotel & Spa, located in Trancoso, Bahia, Brazil